Olga Mikhailovna Chernova (born 15 July 1997) is a Russian footballer who plays as a midfielder for CSKA Moscow and has appeared for the Russia women's national team.

Career
Chernova has been capped for the Russia national team, appearing for the team during the 2019 FIFA Women's World Cup qualifying cycle.

References

External links
 
 
 

1997 births
Living people
Russian women's footballers
Russia women's international footballers
Women's association football midfielders
WFC Rossiyanka players
ZFK CSKA Moscow players